The Dollar Baby (or Dollar Deal) is an arrangement in which American author Stephen King grants permission to students and aspiring filmmakers or theater producers to adapt one of his short stories for $1. King retains the rights to his work, but as he began to experience commercial success, he decided to use the Dollar Baby to help the next generation of creatives. The term may be used to refer to both the adaptation itself and the person adapting it; for example, "The Sun Dog" was made as a Dollar Baby and filmmaker Matt Flesher became a Dollar Baby upon adapting it.

The production budgets have ranged from a few hundred dollars to over $60,000 for projects such as Umney's Last Case, and the film formats range from home video to professional 35 mm film.

History
As King explained in his introduction to the published shooting script for Frank Darabont's The Shawshank Redemption (based on his Different Seasons novella Rita Hayworth and Shawshank Redemption), "Around 1977 or so, when I started having some popular success, I saw a way to give back a little of the joy the movies had given me."

'77 was the year young film makers – college students, for the most part – started writing me about the stories I'd published (first in Night Shift, later in Skeleton Crew), wanting to make short films out of them. Over the objections of my accountant, who saw all sorts of possible legal problems, I established a policy which still holds today. I will grant any student filmmaker the right to make a movie out of any short story I have written (not the novels, that would be ridiculous), so long as the film rights are still mine to assign. I ask them to sign a paper promising that no resulting film will be exhibited commercially without approval, and that they send me a videotape of the finished work. For this one-time right I ask a dollar. I have made the dollar-deal, as I call it, over my accountant's moans and head-clutching protests sixteen or seventeen times as of this writing [1996].

Once the film was made and King received his copy, he explains, "...I'd look at the films... then put them up on a shelf I had marked 'Dollar Babies'."

Frank Darabont was 20 years old when he made his Dollar Baby adaptation of "The Woman in the Room". It was eventually released in 1986 on VHS by Granite Entertainment Group Interglobal Home Video as part of the Stephen King's Night Shift Collection, along with New York University film student Jeff Schiro's adaptation of "The Boogeyman", and John Woodward's "Disciples of the Crow". Darabont later wrote adaptations and directed three feature films based on Stephen King's novels: The Mist, The Shawshank Redemption, and The Green Mile. The latter two films were nominated for multiple Academy Awards including Best Picture.

Author Stephen J. Spignesi was one of the first to publicly discuss the Dollar Babies in his exhaustive volume The Stephen King Encyclopedia. He wrote about two student film adaptations of King stories: "The Last Rung on the Ladder" (1987) by James Cole and Dan Thron, and "The Lawnmower Man" (1987) by Jim Gonis.

1977–1996
As Dollar Babies were not intended to be seen by the public, beyond screening at film festivals and school presentations, and were not commercially sold or openly traded prior to the advent of the Internet, many of them were not known to the Stephen King fan community. In 1996, when King first publicly discussed the Dollar Deal policy, he mentioned "sixteen or seventeen" such Dollar Babies.  It has been difficult to account for them. Although Frank Darabont originally asked in 1980 to adapt King's "The Woman in the Room", he took three years to complete the film.

2000–present 
In 2000, Los Angeles-based filmmaker Jay Holben made a Dollar Deal to adapt "Paranoid: A Chant," a 100-line poem that appears in King's Skeleton Crew. In 2002 the Paranoid short film was the first Dollar Baby to be released - with King's permission - for a limited time on the Internet. Again with King's permission, this film was the first Dollar Baby to be released on a commercial DVD, in a package with Total Movie Magazine, a short-lived offshoot of the U.K. publication Total Film.

Influenced by the success of "Paranoid," in 2002 filmmaker Peter Sullivan wrote and produced a dollar baby based on the short story Night Surf. A precursor to the novel The Stand, "Night Surf" tells the story of a smaller group of teens who seek sanctuary at a beach house while the Captain Trips strain of the flu devastates the population. This short film would later become a calling card for Sullivan, who went on to a career producing and directing over 100 films for television.

In September 2004, fellow Dollar Baby James Renner (who created "All That You Love Will Be Carried Away") organized the first public film festival screenings of Dollar Babies. The festival was held in the D. P. Corbett Business Theater at the University of Maine, Orono, Stephen King's alma mater (1966–1970). As a student, he had written for The Maine Campus newspaper. Renner organized a second Dollar Baby festival in September 2005 at the same location.

On the Internet, the largest public collection of the Dollar Babies has been put together by Bernd Lautenslager from the Netherlands. Many of the films listed above were available for download at a site called "Stephen King Short Movies". At the request of King's representatives, the films are no longer available for download. To date, the only short that King specifically granted permission to play for a limited time on the Internet was Paranoid.

In October 2009, director/producer J. P. Scott completed the first full-length Dollar Baby. His adaptation of "Everything's Eventual" tells the story of a young man with mysterious powers who is recruited by an equally enigmatic corporation. Shortly after receiving a copy of the movie, King viewed the film and was "very impressed" by it. Unusually, he granted J. P. Scott the rights to theatrically distribute the film. The only other Dollar Babies to have been approved for distribution rights were Frank Darabont's "The Woman in the Room" and Jeff Schiro's "The Boogeyman"; these were released as Stephen King's Nightshift Collection.

The first British Dollar Baby was the 2011 adaptation of "Mute", produced by Gemma Rigg and directed by Jacqueline Wright.

In 2012 Russian director Maria Ivanova finished "Beachworld" as a Dollar Baby project. Film was screened on several film festivals around the world. It is the first official Russian Dollar Baby.

In 2015 British director Matthew Rowney produced and directed "I Am the Doorway" as a Dollar Baby project. He won more than 41 international film awards and screened the short film at several US Comic Cons. Since then, several other filmmakers have chosen to adapt the same story.

In 2018 Selina Sondermann began production on "Dedication". This is the second Dollar Baby to be adapted in Germany. Also in 2018, Canadian filmmaker Jon Mann released "Popsy."

In 2019 the Blaenau Gwent Film Academy produced "Stationary Bike", which won various international awards.

In 2019 Walter Perez directed, produced and adapted "One for the Road". The short film was titled "Into the Night". After two successful screenings at the Dryden Theatre and Warner Bros. Studios, Burbank; the film entered the film festival circuit in 2020. The film received acclaim and award nominations at various festivals. In 2021, "Into the Night" was qualified for consideration in the 93rd Academy Awards, under the Best Live Action Short Film Category. 

In 2021, Stephen King Dollar Baby:The Book by Anthony Northrup was released.

In 2021 Barker Street Cinema hosted the Stephen King Rules Dollar Baby Film Festival during the pandemic. It virtually screened 25 films created under the Dollar Deal.

Copyright 
It is a common misconception that the filmmakers of the Dollar Babies have optioned or obtained the legal rights to the original King stories. But, author King retains all rights and simply grants permission to the filmmaker to make a non-commercial adaptation. In the case of The Woman in the Room, The Boogeyman, and Disciples of the Crow, Granite Entertainment Group Interglobal Home Video negotiated and purchased the rights to commercially release the shorts on video in 1986.  The cost of such agreements far surpass the original $1 for Dollar Baby permission. 

These films were originally announced for home video distribution by Gerard Ravels's Native Son International, but after Frank Darabont discovered that Ravels did not secure proper rights to the stories, the release was scrapped. As part of the agreement with King, all Dollar Baby films must include the specific phrase "© Stephen King. Used by Permission. All Rights Reserved."

King's unorthodox arrangement of granting limited permission and retaining rights is the reason the films cannot be commercially released nor can the filmmakers garner any profit from the works. Because King retains the rights, he can allow multiple filmmakers to make adaptations from the same original story.  For example, the story "All That You Love Will Be Carried Away" has been adapted seven times: by James Renner, Anthony Kaneaster, Scott Albanese, Chi Laughlin and Natalie Mooallem (as All That You Love), by Robert Sterling and Brian Berkowitz (as The Secret Transit Codes of America's Highways), and by Hendrik Harms and Chloe Brown under other titles.

King's phrase "so long as the film rights are still mine to assign..." has two meanings. King retains rights to the original material in order to sell them to a legitimate buyer in the future. He also retains rights to material that has not been previously sold (i.e., material to which King still holds all the rights). If another company or individual has purchased the film rights to one of King's stories, he no longer has legal authority to grant permission to a Dollar Baby, as the rights are now held by the buyer.

Because of the restrictions on Dollar Deals, filmmakers cannot upload their films (Dollar Babies) onto video-sharing websites such as YouTube or Vimeo.

Possessory title
Some Dollar Baby filmmakers have mistakenly believed that King's explicit permission to make and showcase the adapted filmwork automatically qualifies the film for a possessory credit (e.g. "Stephen King's Silver Bullet" as opposed to just "Silver Bullet"). But this is a specified legal usage of the author's name, and King does not grant permission for Dollar Baby filmmakers to use his name in this manner. King allows the possessory title to be used only on projects in which he has a direct and considerable involvement.

Previously, the possessory title was applied more liberally until it was abused by the release of Brett Leonard's The Lawnmower Man. Leonard originally released it as Stephen King's The Lawnmower Man, although the adaptation bears little to no resemblance to King's short story. In response, King filed a lawsuit against the filmmakers over this. After a federal court ruled in King's favor, a Second Circuit Court of Appeals upheld that and ruled that King's name should be removed from the film's title, which was done.

Critical commentary
As King has said, "Many of these adaptations weren't so great, but a few showed at least a smattering of talent...in many cases one viewing was all a person could bear." As noted, many, if not the majority, of the Dollar Baby films are made by student or tyro filmmakers. King offered praise to "...a fairly impressive eighteen minute version of 'The Sun Dog'". Darabont's The Woman in the Room, in addition to being photographed by the renowned cinematographer Juan Ruiz Anchia (Glengarry Glen Ross), made the semi-finalist list for Academy Award consideration in 1983. King is quoted as saying that "The Woman in the Room" is "clearly the best of the short films made from my stuff."

Paranoid is among the most critically acclaimed Dollar Babies. Rolling Stone magazine's David Wild said of the film, "Rarely has paranoia been so much fun...Jay Holben has created a stunning and artful rendering of madness, turning a poem by Stephen King into a vivid and compelling nightmare vision."

Noted King historian Andrew Rausch called Mann's Popsy, "A superb gem of a film that excels in every way imaginable. It honors the original source material in a way that many Stephen King adaptations have not -- chiefly by being good."

Notes

References
 Stephen King at the Movies; Horsting, Jessie; Signet Press / Starlog Press, 1986 pp. 94–95 
 Creepshows: The Illustrated Stephen King Movie Guide; Jones, Stephen; Titan Books, 2001 pp. 132–135 
 The Essential Stephen King; Spignesi, Stephen J.; Career Press / New Page Books, 2001 
 "Why Kitty Absolutely Had to Die, or How I Made A Movie of a Stephen King Short Story for a Buck"; Cole, James; appearing in The Lost Works of Stephen King: A Guide to Unpublished Manuscripts, Story Fragments, Alternative Versions and Oddities; Spignesi, Stephen J.; Birch Lane Press, 1998 pp. 346–350 
 "Stephen King's poetry comes to the red screen"; Hollyer, Mary-Beth; Rue Morgue Magazine #21; 'Dreadlines', May/June 2001 pp. 26 Marrs Media Inc.
 "Who's Watching Me"; Holben, Jay; American Cinematographer Magazine, 'Short Takes' vol. 82 no. November 11, 2001 pp. 111–112

External links
The Official Stephen King Web Presence
Dollar Babies on FaceBook
 Stephen King Short Movies
 Liljas Library, extensive fan site (see interviews with filmmakers and reviews of Dollar Babies)
 The Dollar Baby: Reviews & Interviews (official website for the book)
 Dollar Deal: The Story of the Stephen King Dollar Baby Filmmakers (official website for the book)

Stephen King
Films based on short fiction
. Stephen King Dollar Baby:The Book